Prince Konstanty Jacek Lubomirski (1620–1663) was a Polish nobleman (szlachcic).

Konstanty was owner of Jarosław estates. He was Krajczy of the Crown and Podczaszy of the Crown since 1658 and starost of Sącz. He died childless.

1620 births
1663 deaths
Konstanty Jacek
17th-century Polish landowners